József Gáspár (born 28 June 1955) is a former Hungarian professional footballer who played as a goalkeeper, later became a football coach. He was a member of the Hungarian national football team.

Career 
He started his football career with Grànit SK. In 1972, he moved to MTK Budapest FC, where he made his debut in the top flight in 1975. He was a member of the championship-winning team in the 1986-87 season. He played a total of 298 league matches for the blue and white. Between 1989 and 1992 he defended for Belgian team R.W.D. Molenbeek. In 1992 he returned home and joined Budapesti VSC.

National team 
Between 1987 and 1990 he played four times for the Hungarian national team.

As a coach 
From 1993 to 1994 he was head coach of Budafoki MTE. In 1994, he became head of the MTK Budapest FC section. In 1996-97 he was goalkeeper coach of Csepel SC. In 1997 he also served as the team's head coach for 11 matches.

Honours 

 Nemzeti Bajnokság I (NB I)
 Champion: 1986-87
 Magyar Kupa (MNK)
 Winner: 1992
 UEFA Europe League
 Quarter-finalist: 1976-1977

References 

1955 births
Living people
Hungary international footballers
Association football goalkeepers
Hungarian football managers
MTK Budapest FC players
MTK Budapest FC managers
Fehérvár FC managers
Budafoki LC footballers
R.W.D. Molenbeek players
Hungary national football team managers
Budapesti VSC footballers
Nemzeti Bajnokság I players
People from Budapest